Chris Horn may refer to:
 Chris Horn (American football)
 Chris Horn (computer scientist)
 Chris Horn (racing driver)